Hämeenmaa was a Finnish . The class was called the Hämeenmaa class in Finland since the ship had some unique modifications (i.e. British submarine hunting equipment). The two 37 mm twin guns were also replaced with two 40 mm single AA guns in 1975.

Hämeenmaa was rebuilt into a minelayer in the 1980s. A communications central replaced the Hedgehog mounting. The torpedo tubes were removed. A bow twin 30 mm AK-230 was added. Hämeenmaa was decommissioned in 1985.

Operational service
The Hämeenmaas were acquired from the Soviet Union in the mid-1960s, to be used as gun training ships. They formed the "Escort Flotilla" together with the s.

They were initially used one at a time and finally decided to retire them.

Hämeenmaa was in Finnish Navy service between 1964–1985. The sister ship  was decommissioned in 1979 and cannibalized for spare parts for Hämeenmaa. Both ships had already served a few years in the Soviet Navy before sale to Finland.

References

Riga-class frigates
Ships built in the Soviet Union
Cold War frigates of the Soviet Union
Hämeenmaa-class frigates
Cold War frigates of Finland
1956 ships
Finland–Soviet Union relations